Juan Martin "Bai" Elorde (born 3 November 1984) is a Filipino boxer. He is a former WBO Asia Pacific featherweight and WBO Oriental lightweight champion. He is managed and promoted by his father Johnny Elorde.

Early years
Juan Martin Elorde is the eldest of the three sons of Johnny Elorde, and the grandson of Gabriel Elorde. His brother Juan Miguel Elorde is also a boxer. The other is Nico Elorde, a professional Basketball player in the Philippines playing in the PBA.

Elorde and his brothers were introduced to boxing by his father as a way to induce discipline. He started fighting in amateur boxing at age 15 and eventually won gold medal in the national open.

Notable fights
Bai defeated Indonesian Musa Letding to win the vacant WBO Oriental Lightweight title via unanimous decision on 25 March 2016. Bai had a tough time closing in on Letding but was able to counter the latter by his stinging jabs. He won 98-92 in all of the judges' score cards. The title is Elorde's second regional title. The previous was the WBO Asia Pacific Super Featherweight title he held from March 2013 to March 2016.

Professional boxing record

References

Filipino male boxers
Boxers from Metro Manila
Lightweight boxers
1984 births
People from Parañaque
Living people